Elly is an unincorporated community located in Madison County, Virginia, United States.

Elly is the home of Mountain View Nursing Home - a 5-star rated nursing home owned and operated by Oak Grove Mennonite Church and staffed largely by volunteers.

References

Unincorporated communities in Virginia
Unincorporated communities in Madison County, Virginia